Kelvedon Low Level railway station was the western terminus of the Kelvedon and Tollesbury Light Railway in Essex, England. It opened in 1904 and closed in 1951.

There was a single terminal platform on the southeastern side of the Great Eastern Main Line and a steep connecting line to the main line. A footpath linked the low level station to the main Kelvedon railway station.

References

External links
 Kelvedon Low Level station on navigable 1948 O. S. map

Disused railway stations in Essex
Former Great Eastern Railway stations
Railway stations in Great Britain opened in 1904
Railway stations in Great Britain closed in 1951
1904 establishments in England
1951 disestablishments in England